PSR B1828-11 (also known as PSR B1828-10) is a pulsar approximately 10,000 light-years away in the constellation of Scutum. The star exhibits variations in the timing and shape of its pulses: this was at one stage interpreted as due to a possible planetary system in orbit around the pulsar, though the model required an anomalously large second period derivative of the pulse times. The planetary model was later discarded in favour of precession effects as the planets could not cause the observed shape variations of the pulses. While the generally accepted model is that the pulsar is a neutron star undergoing free precession, a model has been proposed that interprets the pulsar as a quark star undergoing forced precession due to an orbiting "quark planet". The entry for the pulsar on SIMBAD lists this hypothesis as being controversial.

References 

10
Scutum (constellation)